Hadashot 13 is one of the three major brands of Israeli television news programmes. Produced for Reshet 13 by Hadashot 10 LTD, a subsidiary of Reshet. The company was previously a subsidiary of Channel 10, and produced news programmes under the name of Channel 10 News until the Reshet-Channel 10 merger that took effect on 16 January 2019.

The company produces the prime time news bulletin at 8 pm IST, the five news bulletin at 5 pm IST, and all its current affairs programmes for Reshet 13.

On March 1, 2016, Channel 10 News began broadcasting in 16:9 aspect ratio.

See also
Reshet 13
Channel 10 (Israeli TV channel)
Ya'akov Eilon
Miki Haimovich
Tamar Ish-Shalom
Tali Moreno
Oshrat Kotler
Nana 10 (Former official website on "Nana 10" news portal website)
HaHadashot 12

References

External links

Channel 10 (Israeli TV channel)
Television production companies of Israel
Israeli television news shows
Channel 13 (Israel) original programming